Bathys Rhyax, possibly also called Krya Pege, was a town of ancient Pontus on the road from Berissa to Sebasteia, inhabited during Byzantine times. Anna Komnene mentions that the town had a shrine to the martyr Theodore.

References

Populated places in ancient Pontus
Former populated places in Turkey
Populated places of the Byzantine Empire
History of Sivas Province